World of Noise is the debut album recorded by American rock band Everclear. It was recorded in a friend's basement for $400 with Art Alexakis on vocals/lead guitar, Craig Montoya on bass, Scott Cuthbert on drums and was released in 1993 by Tim Kerr Records.

Album information

Alexakis used a beat-up Guild Bluesbird guitar to perform the album. For an amp, Alexakis used a Fender Super Twin with a blown 6L6 tube that would squeal every time Art hit a chord.  Often, the amp would overheat and start smoking. When that happened, they would put icepacks on the back and let it cool down, then get back to recording the demo. Despite the problems, Alexakis' amp ended up giving the album a uniquely raucous, noisy sound.

The album was originally never meant to be released, but rather a demo. After finishing the initial sessions, the band compiled a cassette and sold it at shows. Once more material was complete, the band swapped out a couple of songs and issued the album on Tim/Kerr. The original self-released cassette included "Drunk Again", which later appeared on the Nervous & Weird EP and lacked "Nervous & Weird".

When the band signed with Capitol Records in 1994, the label agreed to re-release the album, and remastered it to try to improve the sound. Capitol released their version of the album on November 1, 1994. In the early 2000s, rights to the album reverted to Alexakis, who planned to remix the album and reissue it on his own label, Popularity Recordings. However, problems at his label (and its subsequent closure) shelved the project.

The song "Loser Makes Good" was written about an insane homeless man that shot and killed Art's friend, Phillip Bury, better known by his stage name "Buck Naked" of "Buck Naked and the Barebottom Boys", who released their only album on Alexakis's label, Shindig Records.

Track listing

Personnel
Art Alexakis - lead guitar, vocals, producer, engineer, & mixer
Craig Montoya - bass, movement
Scott Cuthbert - drums, vocals
Karl Brummer - engineer, mixer

References

External links
 "Fire Maple Song" music video

Everclear (band) albums
1993 debut albums
Capitol Records albums
Fire Records (UK) albums
Albums produced by Art Alexakis